Mimmo Calopresti (born 4 January 1955 in Polistena, Calabria) is an Italian film director, screenwriter, producer and actor. He has directed 16 films since 1987. His film The Second Time was entered into the 1996 Cannes Film Festival.

Selected filmography
 The Second Time (1995)
 Notes of Love (1998)
 I Prefer the Sound of the Sea (2000)
 Happiness Costs Nothing (2003)

References

External links

1955 births
Living people
People from the Province of Reggio Calabria
Italian film directors
Italian screenwriters
Italian film producers
Italian male film actors
Italian male screenwriters
Ciak d'oro winners